Thomas Edward Gilbert Jr. (August 14, 1961 – February 18, 1995) better known by his ring name "Hot Stuff" Eddie Gilbert, was an American professional wrestler and booker. 

Gilbert started his wrestling career for the Continental Wrestling Association in 1977, using the ring name Tommy Gilbert Jr. and winning the AWA Southern Tag Team Championship with his father in 1980. He later moved to the World Wrestling Federation in 1982, working a storyline as the protégé of Bob Backlund until leaving the company in 1984. He found his greatest success in Memphis, teaming with Tommy Rich to form “Fargo’s Fabulous Ones” and winning the AWA Southern Tag Team Championship. Gilbert eventually turned heel and feuded with Rich as well as Jerry Lawler. He moved to the Universal Wrestling Federation in 1985, where he wrestled and worked as a manager, forming the villainous stable “Hot Stuff International, Inc.”  

In addition, Gilbert also worked as a booker in promotions like the Global Wrestling Federation and Eastern Championship Wrestling (later known as Extreme Championship Wrestling), while continuing to wrestle in various promotions including Jim Crockett Promotions and the United States Wrestling Association.

Professional wrestling career

Early career (1977-1982)
Gilbert wanted to become a professional wrestler by the second grade, and wrote articles and took photographs for newsstand and ringside magazines as a way to become involved in the business. He was once rumored to have missed his own high school graduation so he could make it to Memphis to lose in the first match on the undercard at the Mid-South Coliseum. After graduating from high school, he made his debut in 1977 in the Memphis, Tennessee-based Continental Wrestling Association as "Tommy Gilbert Jr." in honor of his father, Tommy Gilbert. On February 10, 1979, he and Ricky Reed defeated Jake Dalton and Haiti Charlie. In 1980, he and his father won the AWA Southern Tag Team Championship.

World Wrestling Federation (1982-1984) 
He spent time in the World Wrestling Federation as an enhancement talent in 1982, before being promoted to mid-card status. During this time period, he was touted as the protege of then WWF Champion Bob Backlund. He continued to work his way up the card when he was seriously injured in a car accident in 1983, suffering severe injuries to his neck, arms and back. Some doctors told him he would never be able to wrestle again. Despite this, he spent several months recovering before returning to the ring, and his injuries were so severe that he needed plastic surgery, which Gilbert disguised by growing a beard. Upon his return, he stated on television that Backlund had been a tremendous inspiration to him. At a September 1983 TV taping, Gilbert's neck was (in storyline) reinjured by the Masked Superstar who executed two neckbreakers to Gilbert in the ring to win a match and a third on the floor ringside afterwards, resulting in Gilbert being stretchered from the ring and taken away in an ambulance. Gilbert continued wrestling for the WWF until 1984.

Continental Wrestling Association (1984–1986)
Later, he began making a name for himself as Eddie Gilbert for the CWA in Memphis, Tennessee. He teamed with his father and Ricky Morton over the following years. In addition, he formed a team with Tommy Rich as "Fargo's Fabulous Ones", an attempt by CWA (Memphis) to bury and still cash in on the fame attained by the previous incarnation of the Fabulous Ones, Steve Keirn and Stan Lane, who walked out of the territory after a dispute. They held the AWA Southern Tag Team titles in 1984 until dropping them to Phil Hickerson and the Spoiler (Frank Morrell). The duo would break up soon after, with Gilbert turning heel in the process. The two had a brief but intense feud, which memorably began on television when the two were presented with a "Tag Team of the Year" award by announcer Lance Russell and two guests. Gilbert, unaware his former partner was at the taping, badmouthed Rich, then the International Heavyweight Champion, until Rich came out to confront him. Rich immediately got the upper hand, running Gibert into the steel ringpost several times, bloodying him in the process before the cameras went to a commercial. After the commercial break, Gilbert told Russell he wanted Rich to come back out so he could apologize to him in person, stating he was wrong for still being bitter about the break-up of the team, and was fueled by jealousy of Rich's championship title reign and newfound star status. When Rich accepted Gilbert's apology, Gilbert suddenly turned on him and, in front of a stunned audience and a speechless Russell, rammed Rich's head into the ringpost, just as Rich had done to him moments earlier.

Universal Wrestling Federation (1985-1987)
In 1985, Gilbert went to work for Bill Watts at the Universal Wrestling Federation, and adopted the nickname "Hot Stuff". He started a heel stable of wrestlers called "Hot Stuff International, Inc.", consisting of Sting (Blade Runner Sting), Ultimate Warrior (Blade Runner Rock) and Rick Steiner. He stole Missy Hyatt from John Tatum in 1986, with his stable being renamed "H & H International, Inc." Iceman Parsons and Dick Murdoch would also join his stable later on at different times as well. Sting would eventually leave the stable and feud with them. Eddie also worked as a booker, who came up with the famous Battle of New Orleans angle in late-1987 involving Chris Adams, Terry Taylor, Sting, and himself. Following a match in which Taylor defeated Shane Douglas due to interference by both Gilbert and Rick Steiner, Adams told referee Randy Anderson of the interference.  As Adams pleaded his case with Anderson, Gilbert and Taylor attacked him, and Sting eventually evened the sides. The angle eventually spilled outside the ring into the stands, and near the concession area, featuring a huge brawl involving beer kegs, chairs, trash cans, tables, popcorn machines and other objects. Gilbert was awarded Best Booker of 1988 by the Wrestling Observer Newsletter. He would stay with the Universal Wrestling Federation until the purchase from Jim Crockett Promotions.

Continental Wrestling Federation (1988)
From there, Gilbert worked in Alabama's Continental Wrestling Federation (CWF), where he reformed Hot Stuff Inc. Gilbert also served as booker, with Paul Heyman as his assistant. The CWF was broadcast nationally on the Financial News Network, and Gilbert's creative work was widely praised by wrestling journalists. However, Gilbert left due to conflicts with management.

Jim Crockett Promotions / NWA World Championship Wrestling (1988–1989)
Gilbert went to the NWA's Jim Crockett Promotions (JCP) -- which had purchased the UWF—and brought Hyatt, Heyman and his brother Doug Gilbert with him. Eddie teamed with Rick Steiner to feud with Kevin Sullivan and his Varsity Club. He also became involved in a feud with Ric Flair and Barry Windham in which he teamed with Ricky Steamboat and Lex Luger. Gilbert was told at one point that he would be a member of the Four Horsemen, which he considered the pinnacle of his career, but this did not happen. Near the end of his stint there, JCP was renamed World Championship Wrestling.

USWA and various promotions (1990–1995)
Eddie left WCW in April 1990 and also divorced Hyatt. He went back to the independents where he could book again. He worked for the United States Wrestling Association (USWA) in Memphis (where he feuded with Jerry Lawler) and the Global Wrestling Federation (GWF), as well as Philadelphia's Tri-State Wrestling Alliance promotion. Gilbert's most famous feud in the Memphis territory involved an angle between himself and Lawler in September 1990. Eddie and his brother Doug were "fired" from the promotion, and in retaliation hit Lawler with their car and fled the scene. Numerous home viewers, fearing for Lawler, immediately called the police to report what they had just seen as a legitimate vehicular assault. Lawler had to inform the police what was going on and Lawler was forced to appear on television (while selling his "injuries") sooner than intended out of concern that Gilbert would have been legitimately arrested if he didn't show on TV that he was all right.

Gilbert quit the USWA in January 1991. The on air story was that he had chosen to leave the promotion rather than be injured by Jim Cornette and The Fabulous Ones. Due to a pay dispute, Gilbert, along with his brother Doug (who wrestled under a mask as the Dark Patriot) left the GWF in 1992. Eddie Gilbert took with him the GWF North American Heavyweight Championship belt. He made a few defenses of the title in the USWA as the GWF World Heavyweight champion, despite being stripped of the belt and not being recognized as such by the GWF. Gilbert returned to the USWA until early 1995 when he worked one night for Smoky Mountain Wrestling before traveling to World Wrestling Council in Puerto Rico to wrestle and book. His last wrestling match was against a bear.

NWA Eastern Championship Wrestling (1993)
In 1993, Gilbert wrestled for NWA Eastern Championship Wrestling, where he again teamed with Doug. He also served as head booker for nearly six months, but gave up his position in September 1993 to Paul Heyman. At one point, Gilbert owned 49% of the company. Heyman would take the company in an even more extreme direction, and under the name Extreme Championship Wrestling just 11 months later which saw the company depart the NWA in controversial fashion. Due to ECW's notoriety under Heyman, the company quickly became the third biggest wrestling company in North America behind the WWF and WCW.

Personal life
Gilbert's first marriage was to a woman named Terrie Bardwell Dykes. The two divorced, and Gilbert married wrestling valet Missy Hyatt in October 1987 and they divorced in 1989. Gilbert was also briefly married to Debrah "Madusa" Miceli in 1990, but the marriage only lasted four months.

In early 1994, Gilbert sat down with Bob Barnett and conducted a filmed shoot interview titled "Looking For Mr. Gilbert." Gilbert spoke openly about his life and career at a time when professional wrestlers rarely appeared on film out of character and almost never spoke publicly about the behind-the-scenes machinations of the wrestling business. The footage from the interview was later marketed on home video and sold through wrestling newsletters, as well as at independent wrestling shows, the first of its kind. "Looking For Mr. Gilbert" is now considered the first professional wrestling "shoot video", and in the decades since, countless professional wrestlers have conducted sit-down shoot interviews, most notably in RF Video's Shoot Interview series and Kayfabe Commentaries' YouShoot interview series.

Death
On February 18, 1995, Gilbert died of a massive heart attack in his sleep at his apartment in Isla Verde, Puerto Rico. His body was found by Ken Wayne. Gilbert's father, Tommy Gilbert, stated that injuries to Eddie's chest and heart muscle had occurred in a serious car crash in 1983 and could have been a factor; Eddie's alleged use of painkillers since the accident could also have contributed to his heart condition. The Eddie Gilbert Memorial Brawl was held in his memory from 1996 to 1999.

Championships and accomplishments 

Cauliflower Alley Club
Family Award (2011) – with Doug Gilbert and Tommy Gilbert
Central States Wrestling
NWA Central States Tag Team Championship (1 time) – with Ricky Romero
Continental Wrestling Association
AWA Southern Heavyweight Championship (1 time)
AWA Southern Tag Team Championship (4 times) – with Tommy Gilbert (2), Tommy Rich (1), and Ricky Morton (1)
CWA International Heavyweight Championship (2 times)
Eastern Championship Wrestling
ECW Tag Team Championship (1 time) – with Dark Patriot
ECW Tag Team Championship Tournament (1993)  – with Dark Patriot
Global Wrestling Federation
GWF North American Heavyweight Championship (1 time)
GWF Television Championship (2 times)
GWF Television Championship Tournament (October 1991)
Hardcore Hall of Fame 
Class of 2009
Jim Crockett Promotions
NWA United States Tag Team Championship (1 time) – with Rick Steiner
Memphis Wrestling Hall of Fame
Class of 2017
NWA Tri-State / Mid-South Wrestling Association / Universal Wrestling Federation
Mid-South Tag Team Championship (1 time) - with The Nightmare
NWA Tri-State Tag Team Championship (3 times) – with Ricky Morton (1), and Tommy Gilbert (2)
NWA United States Tag Team Championship (Tri-State version) (1 time) – with Tommy Gilbert
UWF World Tag Team Championship (2 times) – with Sting
UWF World Television Championship (1 time)
Pro Wrestling Illustrated
PWI ranked him #83 of the top 500 singles wrestlers of the "PWI Years" in 2003
United States Wrestling Association
USWA Heavyweight Championship (1 time)
USWA Southern Heavyweight Championship (1 time)
USWA Tag Team Championship (1 time) – with Brian Christopher
USWA Unified World Heavyweight Championship (4 times)
GWF World Heavyweight Championship (actually GWF North American Championship brought over to USWA)
Memphis Wrestling Hall of Fame (Class of 1995)
World Wrestling Council
WWC North American Tag Team Championship  (1 time) – with Tommy Gilbert
Wrestling Observer Newsletter
Most Disgusting Promotional Tactic (1983) Broken neck angle
Best Booker (1988)

See also
 List of premature professional wrestling deaths

References

External links
 
 

1961 births
1995 deaths
20th-century American male actors
American male professional wrestlers
ECW World Tag Team Champions
People from Lexington, Tennessee
Professional wrestlers from Tennessee
Professional wrestling executives
Professional wrestling managers and valets
The Dangerous Alliance members
The First Family (professional wrestling) members
USWA Unified World Heavyweight Champions
20th-century professional wrestlers
USWA World Tag Team Champions
GWF North American Heavyweight Champions
GWF Television Champions
AWA International Heavyweight Champions
NWA/WCW United States Tag Team Champions